Francesco Carosio (died 1427) was a Roman Catholic prelate who served as Archbishop of Trani (1418–1427)
and Bishop of Melfi (1412–1418).

Biography
On 4 Jul 1412, Francesco Carosio was appointed during the papacy of Pope Gregory XII as Bishop of Melfi.
On 26 Jan 1418, he was appointed during the papacy of Pope Martin V as Archbishop of Trani.
He served as Archbishop of Trani until his death on 27 Apr 1427.

References

External links and additional sources
 (for Chronology of Bishops) 
 (for Chronology of Bishops) 
 (for Chronology of Bishops) 
 (for Chronology of Bishops)  

15th-century Italian Roman Catholic bishops
Bishops appointed by Pope Gregory XII
Bishops appointed by Pope Martin V
1427 deaths